, nicknamed "Apple Punch", is a Japanese professional baseball infielder for the Saitama Seibu Lions in Japan's Nippon Professional Baseball.

He was selected .

International career 
Tonosaki represented the Japan national baseball team in the 2017 Asia Professional Baseball Championship, 2018 MLB Japan All-Star Series and 2019 WBSC Premier12.

On October 10, 2018, he was selected Japan national baseball team at the 2018 MLB Japan All-Star Series.

On October 1, 2019, he was selected at the 2019 WBSC Premier12.

References

External links

NPB.com

1992 births
Living people
Japanese baseball players
Nippon Professional Baseball infielders
Nippon Professional Baseball outfielders
Saitama Seibu Lions players
Baseball people from Aomori Prefecture
2019 WBSC Premier12 players